Cynoglossum creticum is a plant in the family Boraginaceae.

It is native to the Mediterranean Basin, including the island of Crete.  It is also found as an invasive plant in the states of Texas and Missouri, USA.

External links

creticum
Flora of Southwestern Europe
Flora of Southeastern Europe
Taxa named by Philip Miller